Moncton High School may refer to:

Moncton High School (1898)
Moncton High School (2015)